Long Branch is an unincorporated community in Panola County, Texas, United States. According to the Handbook of Texas, the community had an estimated population of 181 in 2000.

Geography
Long Branch is located at  (32.072942, -94.567984). It is situated along FM 348 in southwestern Panola County, approximately 14 miles southwest of Carthage.

Long Branch lies 371 feet (113 m) above sea level.

Education
Public education in the community of Long Branch is provided by the Carthage Independent School District.

References

Unincorporated communities in Panola County, Texas
Unincorporated communities in Texas